Perperene ( Perperini) or Perperena (Περπερήνα Perperina) was a city of ancient Mysia on the south-east of Adramyttium, in the neighbourhood of which there were copper mines and good vineyards. It was said by some to be the place in which Thucydides had died. Stephanus of Byzantium calls the town Parparum or Parparon (Παρπάρων), but he writes that some called the place Perine. Ptolemy calls it Perpere or Permere. According to the Suda, Hellanicus of Lesbos, a 5th-century BC Greek logographer, died at Perperene at age 85. At a later date it was given the name Theodosiopolis or Theodosioupolis (Θεοδοσιούπολις).

It is located near Aşagı Beyköy, on the Kozak plateau near Bergama in the Izmir province of Turkey in western Anatolia.

Ecclesiastical history
Perperene was the seat of a bishop; no longer a residential bishopric, it remains a titular see of the Roman Catholic Church.

References

External links
, Ancient coins of Perperene

Populated places in ancient Aeolis
Populated places in ancient Mysia
Former populated places in Turkey
History of İzmir Province
Catholic titular sees in Asia
Bergama District